The Lakeside Park in Owasco, New York is a historic "pleasure ground" park located on Owasco Lake in Cayuga County, New York. It is a  park located within the boundaries of Emerson Park, a  municipal park system.  The property includes four contributing design and architectural features: the remaining  park, including the primary and secondary paths and walkways, vistas, vegetation, and cast-iron lampposts and benches; and the Pavilion, Carousel Shelter, and Refreshment / Concession Stand.  The park was originally designed and laid out in 1895 by the Auburn and Syracuse Electric Railroad Company.  A Charles I. D. Looff carousel was installed in 1900. In 1908, this ride was replaced by another Looff carousel. The focal point of the property is the Pavilion; a Colonial Revival style dance hall and restaurant facility completed in July 1912.  The Carousel Shelter, a twelve-sided structure built in 1921, once held a 1915 Herschell Spillman Company carousel with 51 animals.  In 1972, it was converted into a summer theater.  The Refreshment / Concession was also built in 1921 and moved to its present location in 1921.

It was listed on the National Register of Historic Places in 1989.

References

External links

Emerson Park

Parks on the National Register of Historic Places in New York (state)
1912 establishments in New York (state)
Colonial Revival architecture in New York (state)
Buildings and structures in Cayuga County, New York
Parks in Cayuga County, New York
National Register of Historic Places in Cayuga County, New York